Polycythemia vera  is an uncommon myeloproliferative neoplasm (a type of chronic blood cancer) in which the bone marrow makes too many red blood cells.

Most of the health concerns associated with polycythemia vera are caused by the blood being thicker as a result of the increased red blood cells.  It is more common in the elderly and may be symptomatic or asymptomatic.  Common signs and symptoms include itching (pruritus), and severe burning pain in the hands or feet that is usually accompanied by a reddish or bluish coloration of the skin.  Patients with polycythemia vera are more likely to have gouty arthritis.  Treatment consists primarily of phlebotomy as well as oral chemotherapy and emerging treatments like long-acting interferon formulations.

Signs and symptoms

People with polycythemia vera can be asymptomatic. A classic symptom of polycythemia vera is pruritus or itching, particularly after exposure to warm water (such as when taking a bath), which may be due to abnormal histamine release or prostaglandin production. Such itching is present in approximately 40% of patients with polycythemia vera. Gouty arthritis may be present in up to 20% of patients. Peptic ulcer disease is also common in patients with polycythemia vera; most likely due to increased histamine from mast cells, but may be related to an increased susceptibility to infection with the ulcer-causing bacterium H. pylori.

A classic symptom of polycythemia vera (and the related myeloproliferative disease essential thrombocythemia) is erythromelalgia. This is a burning pain in the hands or feet, usually accompanied by a reddish or bluish coloration of the skin. Erythromelalgia is caused by an increased platelet count or increased platelet "stickiness" (aggregation), resulting in the formation of tiny blood clots in the vessels of the extremity; it responds rapidly to treatment with aspirin.

Pathophysiology
Polycythemia vera (PCV), being a primary polycythemia (increase in the fraction of volume occupied by red cells in the blood), is caused by neoplastic proliferation and maturation of erythroid, megakaryocytic and granulocytic elements to produce what is referred to as panmyelosis. In contrast to secondary polycythemias, PCV is associated with a low serum level of the hormone erythropoietin (EPO). Instead, PCV cells often carry activating mutation in the tyrosine kinase (JAK2) gene, which acts in signaling pathways of the EPO-receptor, making those cells proliferate independent from EPO.

Diagnosis
People with untreated polycythemia vera have a substantial risk of Budd-Chiari syndrome (hepatic vein thrombosis).

A mutation in the JAK2 kinase (V617F) is strongly associated with polycythemia vera.

Treatment
Untreated, polycythemia vera can be fatal, with the median survival in patients being 1.5-3 years.  Data on the effect of life-span of an individual with treated polycythemia vera is inconclusive due to the rarity of the disease. Studies show the median survival rate of controlled Polycythemia Vera ranges from 10 to 20 years.

Frequent blood withdrawals (phlebotomy) is one form of treatment, which often may be combined with other therapies. The removal of blood from the body induces iron deficiency, thereby decreasing the hemoglobin / hematocrit level, and reducing the risk of blood clots. Phlebotomy is typically performed to bring their hematocrit (red blood cell percentage) down below 45 for men or 42 for women. It has been observed that phlebotomy also reduces cognitive impairment.

Medications are also used which reduce the number of red blood cells. These include hydroxyurea and interferon therapy, among others. The tendency of some practitioners to avoid chemotherapy if possible, especially in young patients, is a result of research indicating possible increased risk of transformation to acute myelogenous leukemia (AML). While hydroxyurea is considered a safer chemotherapy in this aspect, there is still some debate about its long-term safety.

There are indications that the lung cancer drug erlotinib may be an additional treatment option for those with certain genetic markers.

Ruxolitinib, a Janus kinase 2 (JAK2) inhibitor, is also used to treat polycythemia.

Ropeginterferon alfa-2b (Besremi) was approved for medical use in the European Union in February 2019, and in the United States in November 2021. Ropeginterferon alfa-2b is the first medication approved by the U.S. Food and Drug Administration (FDA) to treat polycythemia vera that people can take regardless of their treatment history, and the first interferon therapy specifically approved for polycythemia vera. Interferon alfa-2b is also used.

Epidemiology
Polycythemia vera occurs in all age groups, although the incidence increases with age. One study found the median age at diagnosis to be 60 years, while a Mayo Clinic study in Olmsted County, Minnesota found that the highest incidence was in people aged 70–79 years. The overall incidence in the Minnesota population was 1.9 per 100,000 person-years, and the disease was more common in men than women. A cluster around a toxic site was confirmed in northeast Pennsylvania in 2008.

Notable deaths
Phyllis George (1949–2020), American sportscaster and former First Lady of Kentucky
Ron Miles (1963–2022), American jazz trumpeter
Nell Rankin (1924–2005), American mezzo-soprano

References

External links 
 Polycythemia Vera National Heart, Lung, and Blood Institute
 

Myeloid neoplasia
Hematopathology
Rare cancers